Sulfur bacteria may refer to:
 Green sulfur bacteria
 Purple sulfur bacteria
 Sulfate-reducing bacteria
 Sulfur-reducing bacteria